Phalodi Solar Power Plant is a 50 megawatt photo-voltaic power plant in Phalodi city of Rajasthan state in India. The plant was built and commissioned by Welspun Energy under the Jawaharlal Nehru National Solar Mission to promote ecologically sustainable growth.

References

Solar power in India
Renewable energy in India
Energy in Rajasthan
Jodhpur district
Energy infrastructure completed in 2013
2013 establishments in Rajasthan